Acacia obliquinervia, known colloquially as mountain hickory or mountain hickory wattle, is a species of Acacia that is endemic to south eastern Australia.

Description
The has dark brown coloured and deeply fissured bark with  angled or flattened and glabrous branchlets that are often covered in a fine white powdery coating. Like most species of Acacia it has phyllodes rather than true leaves.

Distribution
It is native south eastern New South Wales, the Australian Capital Territory, and Victoria in eastern Australia. In New South Wales it is found  in tableland areas of the Great Dividing Range that are south of the Goulburn River valley where it is found growing in soils derived from the surrounding sandstone as a part of moist or dry sclerophyll forest and woodland communities.

See also
List of Acacia species

References

obliquinervia
Fabales of Australia
Flora of New South Wales
Taxa named by Mary Tindale
Flora of Victoria (Australia)